In the liturgical calendar of the Roman Rite, a solemnity is a feast day of the highest rank celebrating a mystery of faith such as the Trinity, an event in the life of Jesus, his mother Mary, his earthly father Joseph, or another important saint. The observance begins with the vigil on the evening before the actual date of the feast. Unlike feast days of the rank of feast (other than feasts of the Lord) or those of the rank of memorial, solemnities replace the celebration of Sundays outside Advent, Lent, and Easter (those in Ordinary Time).

The word comes from postclassical Latin , meaning a solemnity, festival, celebration of a day.

Ranking

The solemnities of Nativity of the Lord, the Epiphany, the Ascension, and Pentecost are outranked only by the Paschal Triduum.

Other solemnities inscribed in the General Roman Calendar give way also to the following celebrations:
The Paschal Triduum
Sundays of Advent, Lent, and Easter
Ash Wednesday
Weekdays of Holy Week up to and including Thursday
Days within the Octave of Easter

Solemnities inscribed in particular calendars yield not only to these, but also to the Commemoration of All the Faithful Departed.

With the exceptions noted in the table below regarding the solemnities of Saint Joseph and the Annunciation of the Lord, a solemnity that falls on the same day as a celebration of higher rank is transferred to the next day not occupied by a solemnity, a Sunday or a feast.

Among solemnities inscribed in the General Roman Calendar, those of the Lord have precedence over those of the Blessed Virgin and these latter over solemnities of other saints. Thus if, for instance, the Solemnity of the Sacred Heart of Jesus coincides with that of the Nativity of Saint John the Baptist or that of Saints Peter and Paul, it is these that are transferred to the next free day.

Among solemnities inscribed in particular calendars (proper solemnities) the order of precedence is:
The solemnity of the principal patron of the place, city or state
The solemnity of the dedication or anniversary of the dedication of one's own church
The solemnity of the title of one's own church (the mystery or saint to which it is dedicated)
The solemnity of either the title or the founder of a religious institute

List and dates
The solemnities inscribed in the General Roman Calendar and which are therefore observed throughout the Latin Church are indicated in the following list.

Proper solemnities
There are also solemnities not inscribed in the General Roman Calendar, which are observed in particular places, regions, churches or religious institutes. The optional memorial of Saint Patrick on 17 March is a solemnity in Ireland, the memorial of Saint Josemaría Escrivá on 26 June is a solemnity within the prelature of Opus Dei, and the optional memorial of Our Lady of Mount Carmel on 16 July is a solemnity for the Carmelites.

A partial list of proper solemnities follows:

Observance

Even if it is a weekday or within Advent and Lenten season, if the day is a Solemnity, then the Gloria is said or sung, as well as the saying of the Creed at Mass, and there are two scriptural readings, not one, before the Gospel.  Also, there will sometimes be processional and recessional hymns, and use of incense.

Some but not all solemnities are also holy days of obligation, on which, as on Sundays, Catholics are required to attend Mass and to avoid work and business that hinder divine worship or suitable relaxation of mind and body. All holy days of obligation have the rank of solemnity at least at local level, though not necessarily holding that rank in the General Roman Calendar. With the exception of the solemnities of the Sacred Heart of Jesus, the Annunciation of the Lord and the Birth of John the Baptist, all the solemnities inscribed in the General Roman Calendar are mentioned as holy days of obligation in canon 1246 of the Code of Canon Law, but are not necessarily all observed in a particular country.

When a solemnity falls on a Friday, the obligation to abstain from meat or some other food as determined by the episcopal conference does not apply.

See also 
 Afterfeast
 Great Feasts of the Orthodox Church
 Liturgical year
 Holy day of obligation
 Octave (liturgical)
 Ranking of liturgical days in the Roman Rite
 Synaxis

References

External links

 Universalis Liturgical calendar of the Roman Rite with the texts of the Liturgy of the Hours and of the readings at Mass.
 "Solemnity" article from The Catholic Encyclopedia (1912)

Catholic holy days